Cristiano Pereira Figueiredo (born 29 November 1990), known simply as Cristiano, is a Portuguese professional footballer who plays as a goalkeeper for Bulgarian club FC Spartak Varna.

Club career
Born in Munich, Germany to Portuguese parents, Cristiano started playing youth football with Académico de Viseu FC, finishing his development with S.C. Braga. He spent his first two years as a senior as the latter's third choice, also being loaned to F.C. Vizela who acted as the farm team.

Cristiano was signed by Valencia CF from Spain on 24 July 2011, being assigned to the B side in the Segunda División B. He appeared in just five games during his only season.

In summer 2012, Cristiano returned to Portugal and Braga, being again third string with the main squad and competing with the re-created reserves in the Segunda Liga. He made his debut as a professional on 11 August, playing the full 90 minutes in a 2–2 away draw against S.L. Benfica B.

For the 2014–15 campaign, Cristiano went on loan to Académica de Coimbra of the Primeira Liga. He appeared in 28 games in all competitions, helping his team narrowly avoid relegation.

On 5 January 2016, having been deemed surplus to requirements by manager Paulo Fonseca as several other Portuguese players, Cristiano signed a two-and-a-half-year contract with Greek club Panetolikos FC. He returned to his country one year later, going on to represent C.F. Os Belenenses and Vitória de Setúbal in the top tier.

Cristiano joined FC Hermannstadt on 4 July 2019. Two years later, he agreed to a three-year deal at CFR Cluj also from the Romanian Liga I. However, in January 2022 the free agent signed with FC Dinamo București still in that country and league.

International career
Cristiano won his first cap for the Portugal under-21 side on 9 February 2011, playing the second half of a 3–1 friendly win over Sweden in Cartaxo.

Personal life
Cristiano's younger brother, Tobias, was also a footballer. A defender, he played youth football at Sporting CP.

References

External links

1990 births
Living people
German people of Portuguese descent
Citizens of Portugal through descent
Portuguese footballers
Footballers from Munich
Association football goalkeepers
Primeira Liga players
Liga Portugal 2 players
Segunda Divisão players
F.C. Vizela players
S.C. Braga B players
S.C. Braga players
Associação Académica de Coimbra – O.A.F. players
C.F. Os Belenenses players
Vitória F.C. players
Segunda División B players
Valencia CF Mestalla footballers
Super League Greece players
Panetolikos F.C. players
Liga I players
FC Hermannstadt players
CFR Cluj players
FC Dinamo București players
First Professional Football League (Bulgaria) players
PFC Spartak Varna players
Portugal youth international footballers
Portugal under-21 international footballers
Portuguese expatriate footballers
Expatriate footballers in Spain
Expatriate footballers in Greece
Expatriate footballers in Romania
Expatriate footballers in Bulgaria
Portuguese expatriate sportspeople in Spain
Portuguese expatriate sportspeople in Greece
Portuguese expatriate sportspeople in Romania
Portuguese expatriate sportspeople in Bulgaria